Melissa Garff Ballard is an American politician and music educator serving as a member of the Utah House of Representatives for the 20th district. Elected in November 2018, she assumed office on January 1, 2019.

Early life and education
Ballard was born and raised in Davis County, Utah, the daughter of politician, businessman, and religious leader, Robert H. Garff. She earned both bachelor's and master's degrees in music from the University of Utah, and is a Nationally Certified Teacher of Music. During her youth, Ballard lived in England for three years while her father was president of the England Coventry Mission for the Church of Jesus Christ of Latter-day Saints (LDS Church).

Career 
She served on the advisory board for Salt Lake CAP Head Start for six years.

Political career

Ballard succeeded Becky Edwards, who did not seek re-election in 2018. Ballard won the Republican party nomination for the seat in a three-way race in June 2018. Ballard was elected to the Utah House in November 2018, defeating Democrat Ryan L. Jones with 65% of the vote.

In the 2022 legislative session, Rep. Ballard served on the House Education Committee and the House Transportation committee. She also served as the House Vice Chair of the Higher Education Appropriations Subcommittee.

Political Positions and Significant Legislation 

In 2019, Rep. Ballard sponsored a bill which would reform the Utah State Board of Education. Under her bill, the number of board members would be from 15 to 9, all board members would be appointed by the Governor and ratified by the Senate instead of elected by the people, and term limits for board members would be enacted, with two terms as the limit. Other proposed reforms included having one representative from each congressional district, one from the Charter Schools, and four representatives at-large instead of each board member representing a geographical district. The Education Committee voted against the bill 12–3.

In 2021, Rep. Ballard sponsored HB 223, Alternative Fuel Incentives Amendments, "which would create tax credits for hydrogen-powered systems in (Utah)." In defending her legislation, she said that "(Hydrogen is) one of the most abundant elements that we have on the Earth, and for transportation needs, for example, it actually takes less water to fuel cars and trucks with hydrogen than it does for petroleum"   The bill passed the legislature and was signed by the Governor.

Personal life 
Ballard lives in North Salt Lake, Utah. She is a member of the LDS Church and served with her husband, Craig Ballard, when he was president of the Oregon Portland Mission from 2014 to 2017. Her husband is the son of M. Russell Ballard, the current acting president of the LDS Church's Quorum of the Twelve Apostles. Ballard and her husband are the parents of six children.

Ballard's father, Robert Garff, died on March 29, 2020, of COVID-19. Garff and his wife, Katherine, had recently returned from a trip to Palm Springs, California when they were diagnosed.

References

Living people
Women state legislators in Utah
Republican Party members of the Utah House of Representatives
Year of birth missing (living people)
University of Utah alumni
American music educators
Educators from Utah
21st-century American women educators
21st-century American women politicians
21st-century American politicians
21st-century American educators
Latter Day Saints from Utah
Mission presidents (LDS Church)